The Battle for Spain: The Spanish Civil War 1936–1939 is a 2006 history of the Spanish Civil War written by Antony Beevor and published by Weidenfeld & Nicolson. It is a revised edition of Beevor's 1982 The Spanish Civil War.

References 

 
 
 
 
 

1982 edition reviews

External links 

 

1982 non-fiction books
English-language books
Books by Antony Beevor
History books about the Spanish Civil War
Weidenfeld & Nicolson books